James T. O'Donohoe (1898 – 27 August 1928 in Los Angeles, California), born James Thomas Langton O'Donohoe, was a screenwriter in the early days of Hollywood, during the silent film era.

His films include Kindred of the Dust (1922), The Lucky Lady (1926), What Price Glory? (1926), The Spaniard (1926), Two Arabian Knights (1927), Red Lips (1928), and Show Girl (1928).

Partial filmography
Kindred of the Dust (1922)
The Wanderer (1925)
The Lucky Lady (1926)
The Lady of the Harem (1926)
What Price Glory? (1926)
The Spaniard (1926)
The Love Thrill (1927)
Two Arabian Knights (1927)
Cheating Cheaters (1927)
The Noose (1928)
The Hawk's Nest (1928)
Show Girl (1928)

References

External links

1898 births
1928 deaths
American screenwriters
Screenwriters from California